This is a list of bends. A bend is a knot used to join two lengths of rope.  They are used in a variety of situations, including climbing, sailing, and securing loads. Bend knots are classified based on their ability to be tightened or released, their resistance to slipping, and their strength. Some common types of bend knots include the double fisherman's knot, the double overhand knot, and the double figure-eight knot. Bend knots are important because they allow two ropes to be securely joined together, enabling the combined ropes to support weight or transmit force. It is important to choose the appropriate bend knot for the specific task at hand, as some bend knots may be stronger or more secure than others.

The sheet bend is the classic bend.

Misuse of reef knot as a bend 

The common reef knot (square knot) is sometimes mistakenly tied as a bend. When used as a bend rather than a binding knot, the reef knot will capsize under sufficient tension. For this reason, the reef knot is insecure as a bend and as such is not listed as one.

Types of bends

See also
List of knot terminology
Binding knot
Rope splicing
Whipping knot

References

Bibliography 
  (Also available in Gutenberg Project website)

Scoutcraft

de:Liste von Knoten
is:Listi yfir hnúta
he:קשרים
pt:Anexo:Lista de nós
ru:Список узлов
simple:List of knots
ta:முடிச்சுக்களின் பட்டியல்
zh:绳结列表